The Alexander Hoover House, located on South Dakota Highway 79 near Hoover, South Dakota, USA, was listed in the National Register of Historic Places in 1986. The listing included six contributing buildings and a contributing structure.

The one-and-a-half-story main house, built c.1909, has a steep gable roof. It was built for Alexander Hoover, the second postmaster of the town Hoover, which was named for John Hoover.

References

Houses completed in 1909
National Register of Historic Places in Butte County, South Dakota
Houses on the National Register of Historic Places in South Dakota
Houses in Butte County, South Dakota